The 1987 Pittsburgh Pirates season was the 106th season of the Pittsburgh Pirates franchise; and their 101st season in the National League. This was their 18th season at Three Rivers Stadium. The Pirates finished fifth in the National League East with a record of 80–82.

Regular season

Season standings

Game log

|- bgcolor="ffbbbb"
| 1 || April 7 || @ Mets || 2–3 || Ojeda || Patterson (0–1) || Orosco || 46,102 || 0–1
|- bgcolor="ffbbbb"
| 2 || April 9 || @ Mets || 2–4 || Walter || Easley (0–1) || Orosco || 20,598 || 0–2
|- bgcolor="ccffcc"
| 3 || April 10 || Cardinals || 4–3 || Robinson (1–0) || LaPoint || — || 52,119 || 1–2
|- bgcolor="ffbbbb"
| 4 || April 11 || Cardinals || 3–6 || Forsch || Kipper (0–1) || Worrell || 6,720 || 1–3
|- bgcolor="ccffcc"
| 5 || April 12 || Cardinals || 7–4 || Patterson (1–1) || Tudor || Robinson (1) || 6,749 || 2–3
|- bgcolor="ffbbbb"
| 6 || April 13 || Cardinals || 4–8 || Cox || Drabek (0–1) || Horton || 5,182 || 2–4
|- bgcolor="ccffcc"
| 7 || April 15 || @ Cubs || 3–1 (10) || Robinson (2–0) || Noles || — || 5,369 || 3–4
|- bgcolor="ccffcc"
| 8 || April 16 || @ Cubs || 6–0 || Kipper (1–1) || Lynch || — || 6,956 || 4–4
|- bgcolor="ffbbbb"
| 9 || April 17 || Phillies || 2–6 (10) || Bedrosian || Jones (0–1) || — || 10,105 || 4–5
|- bgcolor="ffbbbb"
| 10 || April 18 || Phillies || 6–8 || Tekulve || Robinson (2–1) || — || 19,361 || 4–6
|- bgcolor="ccffcc"
| 11 || April 19 || Phillies || 5–2 || Drabek (1–1) || Ruffin || Robinson (2) || 7,962 || 5–6
|- bgcolor="ccffcc"
| 12 || April 20 || Mets || 9–6 || Easley (1–1) || Myers || — || 8,267 || 6–6
|- bgcolor="ffbbbb"
| 13 || April 21 || Mets || 6–9 || Ojeda || Kipper (1–2) || Orosco || 13,368 || 6–7
|- bgcolor="ffbbbb"
| 14 || April 22 || Mets || 7–8 || Darling || Patterson (1–2) || Orosco || 13,911 || 6–8
|- bgcolor="ffbbbb"
| 15 || April 25 || @ Phillies || 2–3 || Carman || Drabek (1–2) || Tekulve || 18,553 || 6–9
|- bgcolor="ffbbbb"
| 16 || April 26 || @ Phillies || 4–6 || Ruffin || Reuschel (0–1) || Bedrosian || 30,234 || 6–10
|- bgcolor="ccffcc"
| 17 || April 28 || Dodgers || 6–1 || Kipper (2–2) || Valenzuela || Easley (1) || 3,420 || 7–10
|- bgcolor="ffbbbb"
| 18 || April 29 || Dodgers || 2–10 || Welch || Patterson (1–3) || — || 4,668 || 7–11
|- bgcolor="ccffcc"
| 19 || April 30 || Dodgers || 5–4 || Smiley (1–0) || Hershiser || Robinson (3) || 7,114 || 8–11
|-

|- bgcolor="ccffcc"
| 20 || May 1 || Giants || 4–2 || Reuschel (1–1) || Davis || — || 10,651 || 9–11
|- bgcolor="ccffcc"
| 21 || May 2 || Giants || 1–0 || Smiley (2–0) || Downs || Robinson (4) || 14,736 || 10–11
|- bgcolor="ffbbbb"
| 22 || May 4 || @ Padres || 5–9 || Davis || Patterson (1–4) || McCullers || 22,306 || 10–12
|- bgcolor="ccffcc"
| 23 || May 5 || @ Padres || 10–8 || Walk (1–0) || Show || Robinson (5) || 12,642 || 11–12
|- bgcolor="ffbbbb"
| 24 || May 6 || @ Dodgers || 1–2 || Hershiser || Reuschel (1–2) || — || 32,789 || 11–13
|- bgcolor="ffbbbb"
| 25 || May 7 || @ Dodgers || 3–6 || Honeycutt || Kipper (2–3) || Young || 27,621 || 11–14
|- bgcolor="ffbbbb"
| 26 || May 8 || @ Giants || 2–4 || Downs || Fisher (0–1) || Garrelts || 17,985 || 11–15
|- bgcolor="ffbbbb"
| 27 || May 9 || @ Giants || 4–9 || Hammaker || Walk (1–1) || — || 17,609 || 11–16
|- bgcolor="ccffcc"
| 28 || May 10 || @ Giants || 4–1 (11) || Robinson (3–1) || Garrelts || — || 29,652 || 12–16
|- bgcolor="ccffcc"
| 29 || May 12 || Padres || 12–5 || Reuschel (2–2) || Hawkins || — || 5,744 || 13–16
|- bgcolor="ccffcc"
| 30 || May 13 || Padres || 9–5 || Walk (2–1) || Lefferts || Robinson (6) || 7,916 || 14–16
|- bgcolor="ccffcc"
| 31 || May 14 || Padres || 10–3 || Fisher (1–1) || Show || Smiley (1) || 5,592 || 15–16
|- bgcolor="ffbbbb"
| 32 || May 15 || Braves || 3–9 || Assenmacher || Pena (0–1) || — || 18,137 || 15–17
|- bgcolor="ffbbbb"
| 33 || May 16 || Braves || 8–10 || Dedmon || Smiley (2–1) || Garber || 16,939 || 15–18
|- bgcolor="ccffcc"
| 34 || May 17 || Braves || 6–5 || Robinson (4–1) || Olwine || — || 26,469 || 16–18
|- bgcolor="ffbbbb"
| 35 || May 18 || Astros || 1–4 || Scott || Kipper (2–4) || — || 4,213 || 16–19
|- bgcolor="ccffcc"
| 36 || May 19 || Astros || 5–2 || Smiley (3–1) || Meads || Robinson (7) || 6,238 || 17–19
|- bgcolor="ccffcc"
| 37 || May 20 || Astros || 5–3 || Taylor (1–0) || Darwin || Pena (1) || 14,096 || 18–19
|- bgcolor="ccffcc"
| 38 || May 22 || @ Reds || 4–1 || Reuschel (3–2) || Robinson || Smiley (2) || 25,678 || 19–19
|- bgcolor="ccffcc"
| 39 || May 23 || @ Reds || 3–2 || Kipper (3–4) || Pacillo || Robinson (8) || 33,887 || 20–19
|- bgcolor="ccffcc"
| 40 || May 24 || @ Reds || 7–2 || Fisher (2–1) || Browning || — || 30,082 || 21–19
|- bgcolor="ffbbbb"
| 41 || May 25 || @ Astros || 2–7 || Deshaies || Taylor (1–1) || — || 9,618 || 21–20
|- bgcolor="ffbbbb"
| 42 || May 26 || @ Astros || 3–10 || Meads || Pena (0–2) || — || 9,632 || 21–21
|- bgcolor="ffbbbb"
| 43 || May 27 || @ Astros || 2–7 || Lopez || Robinson (4–3) || Smith || 14,863 || 21–22
|- bgcolor="ffbbbb"
| 44 || May 29 || Reds || 6–13 || Hoffman || Kipper (3–5) || — || 26,835 || 21–23
|- bgcolor="ffbbbb"
| 45 || May 30 || Reds || 2–6 || Gullickson || Taylor (1–2) || — || 28,853 || 21–24
|- bgcolor="ffbbbb"
| 46 || May 31 || Reds || 2–5 || Power || Drabek (1–3) || Franco || 24,786 || 21–25
|-

|- bgcolor="ccffcc"
| 47 || June 2 || @ Braves || 4–1 || Reuschel (4–2) || Mahler || — || 8,890 || 22–25
|- bgcolor="ccffcc"
| 48 || June 3 || @ Braves || 4–1 || Kipper (4–5) || Palmer || — || 5,368 || 23–25
|- bgcolor="ffbbbb"
| 49 || June 4 || @ Braves || 3–8 || Smith || Fisher (2–2) || Dedmon || 6,460 || 23–26
|- bgcolor="ffbbbb"
| 50 || June 5 || @ Mets || 1–5 || Gooden || Dunne (0–1) || Orosco || 51,402 || 23–27
|- bgcolor="ffbbbb"
| 51 || June 6 || @ Mets || 2–4 || Fernandez || Drabek (1–4) || McDowell || 47,603 || 23–28
|- bgcolor="ffbbbb"
| 52 || June 7 || @ Mets || 4–5 (10) || McDowell || Robinson (4–4) || — ||  || 23–29
|- bgcolor="ccffcc"
| 53 || June 7 || @ Mets || 10–9 || Taylor (2–2) || McDowell || Robinson (9) || 42,516 || 24–29
|- bgcolor="ffbbbb"
| 54 || June 8 || @ Expos || 1–7 || Heaton || Fisher (2–3) || — || 11,973 || 24–30
|- bgcolor="ccffcc"
| 55 || June 9 || @ Expos || 8–1 || Dunne (1–1) || Sorensen || — || 13,132 || 25–30
|- bgcolor="ffbbbb"
| 56 || June 10 || @ Expos || 3–4 (11) || McClure || Robinson (4–5) || — || 10,134 || 25–31
|- bgcolor="ffbbbb"
| 57 || June 12 || Mets || 2–10 || Fernandez || Reuschel (4–3) || — || 27,465 || 25–32
|- bgcolor="ccffcc"
| 58 || June 13 || Mets || 4–3 || Robinson (5–5) || Myers || — || 26,894 || 26–32
|- bgcolor="ffbbbb"
| 59 || June 14 || Mets || 3–7 || Sisk || Fisher (2–4) || — || 30,477 || 26–33
|- bgcolor="ccffcc"
| 60 || June 15 || @ Cardinals || 3–1 || Dunne (2–1) || Mathews || — || 30,887 || 27–33
|- bgcolor="ffbbbb"
| 61 || June 16 || @ Cardinals || 1–11 || Dawley || Drabek (1–5) || Horton || 27,048 || 27–34
|- bgcolor="ccffcc"
| 62 || June 17 || @ Cardinals || 4–1 || Reuschel (5–3) || Forsch || — || 30,891 || 28–34
|- bgcolor="ffbbbb"
| 63 || June 18 || @ Cardinals || 6–8 (10) || Dawley || Robinson (5–6) || — || 35,264 || 28–35
|- bgcolor="ccffcc"
| 64 || June 19 || @ Cubs || 4–0 || Fisher (3–4) || Noles || — || 33,529 || 29–35
|- bgcolor="ccffcc"
| 65 || June 20 || @ Cubs || 8–2 || Dunne (3–1) || Maddux || — || 34,384 || 30–35
|- bgcolor="ffbbbb"
| 66 || June 21 || @ Cubs || 3–6 || Trout || Drabek (1–6) || Smith || 33,418 || 30–36
|- bgcolor="ffbbbb"
| 67 || June 22 || @ Cubs || 2–3 || Moyer || Reuschel (5–4) || — || 27,064 || 30–37
|- bgcolor="ffbbbb"
| 68 || June 23 || Expos || 2–8 || Heaton || Kipper (4–6) || Parrett || 9,276 || 30–38
|- bgcolor="ccffcc"
| 69 || June 24 || Expos || 9–6 || Fisher (4–4) || Fischer || — || 21,564 || 31–38
|- bgcolor="ffbbbb"
| 70 || June 25 || Expos || 2–7 || Martinez || Dunne (3–2) || McGaffigan || 10,836 || 31–39
|- bgcolor="ccffcc"
| 71 || June 26 || Cubs || 5–2 || Jones (1–1) || Maddux || Robinson (10) || 20,408 || 32–39
|- bgcolor="ccffcc"
| 72 || June 27 || Cubs || 7–0 || Reuschel (6–4) || Moyer || — || 31,595 || 33–39
|- bgcolor="ccffcc"
| 73 || June 28 || Cubs || 6–2 || Jones (2–1) || Sutcliffe || — || 25,304 || 34–39
|- bgcolor="ffbbbb"
| 74 || June 29 || @ Phillies || 5–6 || Jackson || Jones (2–2) || Bedrosian ||  || 34–40
|- bgcolor="ffbbbb"
| 75 || June 29 || @ Phillies || 3–11 || Bair || Dunne (3–3) || Ritchie || 30,046 || 34–41
|- bgcolor="ffbbbb"
| 76 || June 30 || @ Phillies || 4–6 || Gross || Drabek (1–7) || Bedrosian || 20,598 || 34–42
|-

|- bgcolor="ffbbbb"
| 77 || July 1 || @ Phillies || 4–11 || Rawley || Taylor (2–3) || — || 19,977 || 34–43
|- bgcolor="ccffcc"
| 78 || July 3 || Dodgers || 6–0 || Reuschel (7–4) || Valenzuela || — || 22,454 || 35–43
|- bgcolor="ccffcc"
| 79 || July 4 || Dodgers || 4–2 || Kipper (5–6) || Welch || Robinson (11) || 12,935 || 36–43
|- bgcolor="ffbbbb"
| 80 || July 5 || Dodgers || 1–6 || Hershiser || Fisher (4–5) || Young || 13,438 || 36–44
|- bgcolor="ffbbbb"
| 81 || July 6 || Giants || 5–7 || Dravecky || Dunne (3–4) || Garrelts ||  || 36–45
|- bgcolor="ffbbbb"
| 82 || July 6 || Giants || 4–7 || LaCoss || Drabek (1–8) || Lefferts || 11,204 || 36–46
|- bgcolor="ccffcc"
| 83 || July 7 || Giants || 6–4 (12) || Gideon (1–0) || Price || — || 7,027 || 37–46
|- bgcolor="ffbbbb"
| 84 || July 8 || Giants || 4–8 (14) || Robinson || Gideon (1–1) || — || 10,868 || 37–47
|- bgcolor="ccffcc"
| 85 || July 10 || Padres || 6–5 (11) || Robinson (7–6) || Gossage || — || 13,109 || 38–47
|- bgcolor="ffbbbb"
| 86 || July 11 || Padres || 1–3 || Grant || Fisher (4–6) || Davis || 27,476 || 38–48
|- bgcolor="ccffcc"
| 87 || July 12 || Padres || 4–2 || Dunne (4–4) || Show || Gideon (1) || 13,276 || 39–48
|- bgcolor="ffbbbb"
| 88 || July 16 || @ Dodgers || 0–7 || Valenzuela || Kipper (5–7) || — || 32,845 || 39–49
|- bgcolor="ffbbbb"
| 89 || July 17 || @ Dodgers || 2–3 (10) || Young || Robinson (7–7) || — || 28,466 || 39–50
|- bgcolor="ccffcc"
| 90 || July 18 || @ Dodgers || 4–2 || Drabek (2–8) || Hershiser || Jones (1) || 34,864 || 40–50
|- bgcolor="ccffcc"
| 91 || July 19 || @ Dodgers || 7–2 || Dunne (5–4) || Honeycutt || Smiley (3) || 37,548 || 41–50
|- bgcolor="ccffcc"
| 92 || July 20 || @ Giants || 7–6 || Fisher (5–6) || LaCoss || Robinson (12) || 6,919 || 42–50
|- bgcolor="ffbbbb"
| 93 || July 21 || @ Giants || 0–7 || Dravecky || Kipper (5–8) || — || 8,382 || 42–51
|- bgcolor="ccffcc"
| 94 || July 22 || @ Giants || 4–0 || Reuschel (8–4) || Downs || — || 14,472 || 43–51
|- bgcolor="ffbbbb"
| 95 || July 23 || @ Padres || 1–2 || Show || Drabek (2–9) || Gossage || 14,911 || 43–52
|- bgcolor="ccffcc"
| 96 || July 24 || @ Padres || 3–2 || Dunne (6–4) || Jones || Gideon (2) || 17,136 || 44–52
|- bgcolor="ccffcc"
| 97 || July 25 || @ Padres || 9–3 || Fisher (6–6) || Hawkins || — || 19,764 || 45–52
|- bgcolor="ffbbbb"
| 98 || July 26 || @ Padres || 4–7 || Whitson || Kipper (5–9) || — || 13,219 || 45–53
|- bgcolor="ffbbbb"
| 99 || July 28 || Phillies || 2–5 || Rawley || Reuschel (8–5) || — || 16,270 || 45–54
|- bgcolor="ffbbbb"
| 100 || July 29 || Phillies || 3–4 || Carman || Drabek (2–10) || Bedrosian || 28,392 || 45–55
|- bgcolor="ffbbbb"
| 101 || July 30 || Phillies || 0–1 || Ruffin || Smiley (3–2) || Bedrosian || 11,769 || 45–56
|- bgcolor="ffbbbb"
| 102 || July 31 || @ Cardinals || 3–4 || Dayley || Jones (2–4) || — || 38,757 || 45–57
|-

|- bgcolor="ffbbbb"
| 103 || August 1 || @ Cardinals || 6–7 (10) || Worrell || Jones (2–5) || — || 47,106 || 45–58
|- bgcolor="ffbbbb"
| 104 || August 2 || @ Cardinals || 1–9 || Magrane || Pena (0–3) || — || 44,695 || 45–59
|- bgcolor="ccffcc"
| 105 || August 3 || Cubs || 6–4 || Drabek (3–10) || Maddux || Gott (1) || 7,281 || 46–59
|- bgcolor="ffbbbb"
| 106 || August 4 || Cubs || 2–3 (11) || Mason || Gideon (1–2) || — || 8,744 || 46–60
|- bgcolor="ccffcc"
| 107 || August 5 || Cubs || 10–0 || Fisher (7–6) || Moyer || — || 7,726 || 47–60
|- bgcolor="ffbbbb"
| 108 || August 6 || Expos || 3–6 || Parrett || Gott (0–1) || Burke || 7,755 || 47–61
|- bgcolor="ccffcc"
| 109 || August 7 || Expos || 9–3 || Walk (3–1) || Sebra || Gideon (3) || 22,075 || 48–61
|- bgcolor="ccffcc"
| 110 || August 8 || Expos || 5–2 || Drabek (4–10) || Smith || Smiley (4) || 18,285 || 49–61
|- bgcolor="ccffcc"
| 111 || August 9 || Expos || 4–3 || Dunne (7–4) || Parrett || Gott (2) || 18,829 || 50–61
|- bgcolor="ffbbbb"
| 112 || August 10 || Cardinals || 0–6 || Forsch || Fisher (7–7) || — || 11,445 || 50–62
|- bgcolor="ffbbbb"
| 113 || August 11 || Cardinals || 5–6 || Dayley || Reuschel (8–6) || Worrell || 14,637 || 50–63
|- bgcolor="ccffcc"
| 114 || August 12 || Cardinals || 11–0 || Walk (4–1) || Magrane || — || 15,186 || 51–63
|- bgcolor="ffbbbb"
| 115 || August 13 || @ Expos || 7–9 || McGaffigan || Gideon (1–3) || McClure || 23,609 || 51–64
|- bgcolor="ffbbbb"
| 116 || August 14 || @ Expos || 3–4 || McClure || Smiley (3–3) || — || 20,501 || 51–65
|- bgcolor="ffbbbb"
| 117 || August 15 || @ Expos || 3–6 || Burke || Fisher (7–8) || — || 23,894 || 51–66
|- bgcolor="ffbbbb"
| 118 || August 16 || @ Expos || 7–10 || Parrett || Gideon (1–4) || — || 26,134 || 51–67
|- bgcolor="ccffcc"
| 119 || August 18 || @ Reds || 7–4 || Walk (5–1) || Murphy || Gott (3) || 29,385 || 52–67
|- bgcolor="ccffcc"
| 120 || August 19 || @ Reds || 10–9 || Drabek (5–10) || Browning || — || 24,179 || 53–67
|- bgcolor="ffbbbb"
| 121 || August 20 || @ Reds || 3–5 || Power || Dunne (7–5) || Franco || 22,542 || 53–68
|- bgcolor="ffbbbb"
| 122 || August 21 || @ Braves || 4–5 || Smith || Smiley (3–4) || Olwine || 15,783 || 53–69
|- bgcolor="ffbbbb"
| 123 || August 22 || @ Braves || 3–10 || Glavine || Walk (5–2) || — || 22,173 || 53–70
|- bgcolor="ffbbbb"
| 124 || August 23 || @ Braves || 2–6 || Palmer || Bielecki (0–1) || — || 10,699 || 53–71
|- bgcolor="ccffcc"
| 125 || August 24 || Reds || 5–4 || Drabek (6–10) || Browning || Gott (4) || 11,020 || 54–71
|- bgcolor="ccffcc"
| 126 || August 25 || Reds || 1–0 || Dunne (8–5) || Power || — || 10,149 || 55–71
|- bgcolor="ccffcc"
| 127 || August 26 || Reds || 6–5 || Robinson (8–7) || Franco || — || 13,722 || 56–71
|- bgcolor="ccffcc"
| 128 || August 28 || Astros || 4–2 || Walk (6–2) || Scott || Gott (5) || 11,917 || 57–71
|- bgcolor="ccffcc"
| 129 || August 29 || Astros || 8–2 || Bielecki (1–1) || Ryan || — || 26,585 || 58–71
|- bgcolor="ccffcc"
| 130 || August 30 || Astros || 7–0 || Drabek (7–10) || Knepper || — || 26,867 || 59–71
|- bgcolor="ccffcc"
| 131 || August 31 || Braves || 7–3 || Dunne (9–5) || Dedmon || — || 4,930 || 60–71
|-

|- bgcolor="ffbbbb"
| 132 || September 1 || Braves || 0–4 || Smith || Fisher (7–9) || — || 7,498 || 60–72
|- bgcolor="ccffcc"
| 133 || September 2 || Braves || 2–0 || Walk (7–2) || Glavine || Gott (6) || 6,259 || 61–72
|- bgcolor="ffbbbb"
| 134 || September 4 || @ Astros || 0–2 || Ryan || Bielecki (1–2) || Agosto || 16,367 || 61–73
|- bgcolor="ffbbbb"
| 135 || September 5 || @ Astros || 1–5 || Knepper || Drabek (7–11) || — || 27,887 || 61–74
|- bgcolor="ccffcc"
| 136 || September 6 || @ Astros || 4–3 || Dunne (10–5) || Hernandez || Gott (7) || 25,374 || 62–74
|- bgcolor="ccffcc"
| 137 || September 7 || @ Cubs || 3–2 || Fisher (8–9) || Moyer || Robinson (13) || 21,745 || 63–74
|- bgcolor="ccffcc"
| 138 || September 8 || @ Cubs || 4–1 || Palacios (1–0) || Sutcliffe || Gott (8) || 8,331 || 64–74
|- bgcolor="ccffcc"
| 139 || September 9 || @ Cubs || 4–3 || Robinson (9–7) || Smith || Gott (9) || 8,054 || 65–74
|- bgcolor="ccffcc"
| 140 || September 11 || @ Phillies || 4–2 || Drabek (8–11) || Gross || Gott (10) || 20,085 || 66–74
|- bgcolor="ccffcc"
| 141 || September 12 || @ Phillies || 12–4 || Dunne (11–5) || Carman || — || 15,440 || 67–74
|- bgcolor="ccffcc"
| 142 || September 13 || @ Phillies || 6–1 || Fisher (9–9) || Ruffin || — || 12,610 || 68–74
|- bgcolor="ffbbbb"
| 143 || September 14 || Expos || 4–6 (14) || McGaffigan || Gideon (1–5) || Parrett || 5,869 || 68–75
|- bgcolor="ccffcc"
| 144 || September 15 || Expos || 5–1 || Bielecki (2–2) || Heaton || — || 5,852 || 69–75
|- bgcolor="ffbbbb"
| 145 || September 16 || Cardinals || 5–8 || Tudor || Drabek (8–12) || — || 15,323 || 69–76
|- bgcolor="ccffcc"
| 146 || September 17 || Cardinals || 1–0 || Dunne (12–5) || Mathews || Gott (11) || 5,640 || 70–76
|- bgcolor="ccffcc"
| 147 || September 18 || Mets || 10–9 || Smiley (4–4) || Myers || Gott (12) || 15,308 || 71–76
|- bgcolor="ffbbbb"
| 148 || September 19 || Mets || 4–5 || Aguilera || Palacios (1–1) || McDowell || 20,933 || 71–77
|- bgcolor="ccffcc"
| 149 || September 20 || Mets || 9–8 (14) || Smiley (5–4) || Ojeda || — || 19,122 || 72–77
|- bgcolor="ccffcc"
| 150 || September 21 || @ Expos || 5–2 || Drabek (9–12) || Sebra || Robinson (14) || 13,206 || 73–77
|- bgcolor="ffbbbb"
| 151 || September 22 || @ Expos || 3–4 || Perez || Gott (0–2) || Burke || 16,407 || 73–78
|- bgcolor="ccffcc"
| 152 || September 23 || @ Cardinals || 2–0 || Fisher (10–9) || Mathews || — || 30,235 || 74–78
|- bgcolor="ffbbbb"
| 153 || September 24 || @ Cardinals || 2–3 || Horton || Robinson (9–8) || — || 35,921 || 74–79
|- bgcolor="ffbbbb"
| 154 || September 25 || @ Mets || 2–10 || Fernandez || Bielecki (2–3) || — || 41,987 || 74–80
|- bgcolor="ccffcc"
| 155 || September 26 || @ Mets || 8–2 || Drabek (10–12) || Gooden || — || 48,695 || 75–80
|- bgcolor="ffbbbb"
| 156 || September 27 || @ Mets || 3–12 || Ojeda || Dunne (12–6) || Orosco || 48,588 || 75–81
|- bgcolor="ccffcc"
| 157 || September 30 || Cubs || 5–3 || Fisher (11–9) || Sutcliffe || Robinson (15) ||  || 76–81
|- bgcolor="ffbbbb"
| 158 || September 30 || Cubs || 8–10 || Hall || Smiley (5–5) || — || 6,985 || 76–82
|-

|- bgcolor="ccffcc"
| 159 || October 1 || Cubs || 12–3 || Drabek (11–12) || Sanderson || — || 5,294 || 77–82
|- bgcolor="ccffcc"
| 160 || October 2 || Phillies || 6–4 || Walk (8–2) || Jackson || Gott (13) || 8,245 || 78–82
|- bgcolor="ccffcc"
| 161 || October 3 || Phillies || 10–5 || Palacios (2–1) || Gross || — || 12,790 || 79–82
|- bgcolor="ccffcc"
| 162 || October 4 || Phillies || 4–2 || Dunne (13–6) || Bedrosian || Robinson (16) || 26,734 || 80–82
|-

|-
| Legend:       = Win       = LossBold = Pirates team member

Record vs. opponents

Detailed records

Roster

Opening Day lineup

Player stats
Batting
Note: G = Games played; AB = At bats; H = Hits; Avg. = Batting average; HR = Home runs; RBI = Runs batted in

Pitching
Note: G = Games pitched; IP = Innings pitched; W = Wins; L = Losses; ERA = Earned run average; SO = Strikeouts

Awards and honors

1987 Major League Baseball All-Star Game
Rick Reuschel, P, reserve

Transactions
 November 7, 1986 – Released U.L. Washington.
 November 12, 1986 – Released Ray Krawczyk.
 November 26, 1986 – Traded Pat Clements, Cecilio Guante and Rick Rhoden to the New York Yankees. Received Doug Drabek, Logan Easley and Brian Fisher.
 December 4, 1986 – Signed Butch Davis as a free agent.
 December 4, 1986 – Signed Vicente Palacios as a free agent.
 December 4, 1986 – Signed Mark Ross as a free agent.
 December 5, 1986 – Traded Rick Renteria to the Seattle Mariners. Received a player to be named later. The Seattle Mariners sent Bob Siegel (minors) (December 10, 1986) to the Pittsburgh Pirates to complete the trade.
 December 8, 1986 – Cecil Espy drafted by the Texas Rangers in the 1986 rule 5 draft.
 December 8, 1986 – Vicente Palacios drafted by the Milwaukee Brewers in the 1986 rule 5 draft.
 December 10, 1986 – Signed Houston Jimenez as a free agent.
 December 20, 1986 – Released Lee Tunnell.
 January 9, 1987 – Signed Carlos Garcia as an amateur free agent.
 January 20, 1987 – Signed U.L. Washington as a free agent.
 February 6, 1987 – Signed Lee Tunnell as a free agent.
 February 9, 1987 – Signed Onix Concepción as a free agent.
 March 22, 1987 – Purchased Dann Bilardello from the Montreal Expos.
 March 27, 1987 – Traded Jim Winn to the Chicago White Sox. Received John Cangelosi.
 March 31, 1987 – Released Mike Brown.
 April 1, 1987 – Traded Tony Peña to the St. Louis Cardinals. Received Mike Dunne, Mike LaValliere and Andy Van Slyke.
 April 3, 1987 – The Milwaukee Brewers returned Vicente Palacios (earlier draft pick).
 April 6, 1987 – Sold Lee Tunnell to the St. Louis Cardinals.
 April 6, 1987 – Released Larry McWilliams.
 May 19, 1987 – Purchased Paul Wilmet from the St. Louis Cardinals.
 May 29, 1987 – Traded Bill Almon to the New York Mets. Received Scott Little and Al Pedrique.
 June 2, 1987 – Drafted Ben Shelton in the 2nd round of the 1987 amateur draft.
 June 2, 1987 – Drafted Brian Williams in the 3rd round of the 1987 amateur draft, but did not sign the player.
 June 2, 1987 – Drafted Wes Chamberlain in the 4th round of the 1987 amateur draft. Player signed June 12, 1987.
 June 2, 1987 – Drafted Mickey Morandini in the 7th round of the 1987 amateur draft, but did not sign the player.
 June 2, 1987 – Drafted Kurt Knudsen in the 8th round of the 1987 amateur draft, but did not sign the player.
 June 2, 1987 – Drafted Steve Carter in the 17th round of the 1987 amateur draft.
 June 2, 1987 – Drafted Mike Fyhrie in the 19th round of the 1987 amateur draft, but did not sign the player.
 June 2, 1987 – Drafted Bob Ayrault in the 26th round of the 1987 amateur draft, but did not sign the player.
 June 2, 1987 – Drafted Paul Miller in the 53rd round of the 1987 amateur draft.
 June 15, 1987 – Released Onix Concepción.
 June 26, 1987 – Traded Pete Rice (minors) and Shawn Holman to the Detroit Tigers. Received Terry Harper.
 July 23, 1987 – Sold Dann Bilardello to the Kansas City Royals.
 July 31, 1987 – Traded Don Robinson to the San Francisco Giants. Received Mackey Sasser and $50,000.
 August 3, 1987 – Selected Jim Gott off waivers from the San Francisco Giants.
 August 7, 1987 – Traded Jim Morrison to the Detroit Tigers. Received a player to be named later and Darnell Coles. The Detroit Tigers sent Morris Madden (August 12, 1987) to the Pittsburgh Pirates to complete the trade.
 August 21, 1987 – Traded Rick Reuschel to the San Francisco Giants. Received Scott Medvin and Jeff Robinson.
 August 29, 1987 – Traded Johnny Ray to the California Angels. Received a player to be named later and Billie Merrifield (minors). The California Angels sent Miguel Garcia (September 3, 1987) to the Pittsburgh Pirates to complete the trade.
 October 5, 1987 – Released U.L. Washington.
 October 15, 1987 – Butch Davis granted free agency.
 October 15, 1987 – Houston Jimenez granted free agency.
 October 15, 1987 – Mark Ross granted free agency.

Farm system

LEAGUE CHAMPIONS: Harrisburg, Salem

References

 1987 Pittsburgh Pirates at Baseball Reference
 1987 Pittsburgh Pirates at Baseball Almanac

Pittsburgh Pirates seasons
Pittsburgh Pirates season
Pitts